The Guarded Domains of Iran (Mamâlek-e Mahruse-ye Irân), or simply the Domains of Iran (Mamâlek-e Irân) and the Guarded Domains (Mamâlek-e Mahruse), was the common and official name of Iran from the Safavid era, until the early 20th century. The idea of the Guarded Domains illustrated a feeling of territorial and political uniformity in a society where the Persian language, culture, monarchy, and Shia Islam became integral elements of the developing national identity. According to the modern historian Ali Mir Ansari, this name demonstrates that the concept of Iran existed before the rise of nationalism.

The concept presumably started to form under the Mongol Ilkhanate in the late 13th-century, a period in which regional actions, trade, written culture, and partly Shi'ism, contributed to the establishment of the early modern Persianate world. The definition of the Guarded Domains' borders was almost identical to that of Eranshahr in the Sasanian-era text Letter of Tansar, as well as the description by the 14th-century geographer Hamdallah Mustawfi in his Nuzhat al-Qulub.

Mirza Fazlollah Khavari Shirazi, the vaqaye-negar (court chronicler) of Fath-Ali Shah Qajar, wrote in his Tarikh-e Zu'l-Qarneyn that ruling all of the Guarded Domains of Iran was one of the requirements to be considered the legitimate ruler of the country.

References

Sources

Further reading 
 

History of Iran
Safavid Iran
Qajar Iran
Afsharid Iran